The 1987–88 Japan Ice Hockey League season was the 22nd season of the Japan Ice Hockey League. Six teams participated in the league, and the Oji Seishi Hockey won the championship.

Regular season

External links
 Japan Ice Hockey Federation

Japan
Japan League
Japan Ice Hockey League seasons
Japan